Bruce Smith (born 1946) is an American poet.

Life
Smith was born and raised in Philadelphia. He taught at the University of Alabama, Phillips Academy, Andover and now teaches at Syracuse University. He has been a co-editor of the Graham House Review and a contributing editor of Born Magazine.

Awards
 “Discovery”/The Nation Award winner
 2000 Guggenheim Fellowship
 National Endowment for the Arts grant
 Massachusetts Foundation for the Arts grant
 1984 National Poetry Series Selection, for Silver and Information
 National Book Award and the Pulitzer Prize finalist for The Other Lover
 National Book Award finalist for Devotions
 2012 William Carlos Williams Award presented by the Poetry Society of America
Finalist, National Book Award and Pulitzer Prize

Collections

Anthologies
 
 
 2009 Pushcart Prize anthology

References

Further reading
 Review of Devotions (2011).

External links
"Devotion: The Burnt-Over District", Poetry (January 2008)
"Devotion: The Garment District", Poetry (January 2008)
"Obbligato", Poetry (April 2004)
"The Game", The New Yorker, September 7, 2009
"Something of Consolation", AGNI 56, 2002
"Still", Greensboro Review, 2007
"Silver and Information", Poetry Foundation
"Letter to T.", Ploughshares, Winter 1998-99
"Jelly 292 ", Ploughshares, Winter 1998-99
"Airless ", Ploughshares, Fall 2001

1946 births
Living people
American male poets
Writers from Philadelphia
Syracuse University faculty
University of Alabama faculty
20th-century American poets
21st-century American poets
20th-century American male writers
21st-century American male writers